Dmitry Usachev (born 20 February 1988 is a Belarusian former footballer.

References

External links
 
 Profile at pressball.by

1988 births
Living people
Belarusian footballers
FC Vitebsk players
FC Slavia Mozyr players
FC DSK Gomel players
FC Granit Mikashevichi players
FC Orsha players
Association football defenders